Spathoglottis paulinae, commonly known as the small purple orchid, is a plant in the orchid family and is native to New Guinea and Tropical North Queensland. It is an evergreen terrestrial orchid with crowded pseudobulbs, between four and seven large, pleated leaves and up to thirty mauve to purple flowers.

Description
There are between four and seven dark green, pleated leaves emerging from each pseudobulb. The sepals are egg-shaped with the narrower end towards the base, the petals are broadly egg-shaped and all five make a star-like shape. The middle lobe is spatula-shaped with two yellow calli and the side lobes are narrow and curve upwards. Flowering occurs between July and March. Some plants appear to be self-pollinating with flowers that barely open whilst others are insect pollinated and open widely for a few days.

Taxonomy and naming
Spathoglottis paulinae was first formally described in 1867 by Ferdinand von Mueller who published the description in Fragmenta phytographiae Australiae.

Distribution and habitat
'The small purple orchid grows in wet places with grasses in open forest. It occurs in Papua New Guinea, West New Guinea in tropical north Queensland between Cooktown and Ingham and in northern parts of the Northern Territory.

References

paulineae
Plants described in 1867
Orchids of Papua New Guinea
Orchids of Australia
Taxa named by Ferdinand von Mueller